Magyarosuchus is an extinct monotypic genus of metriorhynchoid described for the first time from fossils discovered in the Kisgerecse Marl Formation in Hungary. The type species Magyarosuchus fitosi lived during the Toarcian, about 180 million years ago. Most of the skeleton is known, including parts of the jaw, torso, legs and tail, which was discovered in 1996.

References

Fossil taxa described in 2018
Thalattosuchians
Prehistoric pseudosuchian genera
Prehistoric marine crocodylomorphs
Early Jurassic crocodylomorphs
Jurassic reptiles of Europe